Epinephelus cifuentesi, the olive grouper,  is a species of marine ray-finned fish of the Family Serranidae and subfamily Epinephelus. It is found in the Eastern Pacific Ocean off the coasts of Costa Rica and the Galapagos islands. It inhabits deep-water rocky reefs between 40120 m in depth.

Description 
It is described to have a convex head shape with a fusiform lateral body shape and truncate caudal fins. Its body is covered with ctenoid scales and has a distinct coloration of pale brown with a greenish sheen, fins are a darker brown than the body and have a blue-green sheen. It has a maximum length of 100 cm and a weight of around 22.3 kg.

References 

Epinephelus
Fish described in 1993